The Biellmann spin is a difficult variation of the layback spin in figure skating. It was made popular by world champion Denise Biellmann.

Description 

The Biellmann spin is a difficult variation of the layback spin in figure skating. It is executed by the skater grabbing their free blade and pulling the heel of their boot behind and above the level of the head so that their legs are in an approximate full split, with the head and back arched upward. The spin "requires much strength and extreme flexibility". The Biellmann increases the complexity of a skater's short or free program only if they execute eight revolutions, in either a backward and/or sideway position without any changes, before attempting the Biellmann and if they clearly increase the speed of the spin. Advanced novice skaters must complete six revolutions before executing a Biellmann spin. Like other categories of difficult spin variations, the Biellmann is counted in a skater's score, in both the short and free skating programs, only the first time it is completed.

The Biellmann spin was made popular by world champion Denise Biellmann. Russian figure skater Irina Slutskaya invented and was noted for the double Biellmann spin with a foot change, which is executed by the skater reaching back with their hands, grabbing the blade of one skate and pulling it straight over their head, and then performing the same action with the other skate. The Biellmann spin, due to the flexibility required in executing it, is "a signature move for women in the sport". Male skaters, as a result, do not execute it as commonly as women, although a notable exception is two-time Olympic champion Yuzuru Hanyu.

Photo gallery

References

Works cited

 "Technical Panel Handbook: Pair Skating 2022/2023" (PDF). (Tech Panel) ISU Judging System. International Skating Union. 15July 2022. Retrieved 3 August 2022.

External links 

 Irina Slutskaya performing the double Biellmann spin with a foot change, during her free skating program at 2000 Worlds Championships. Event occurs between 3.55–4.12. Retrieved 3 July 2022.
 Yuzuru Hanyu: compilation clip of his Biellman spin. Retrieved 3 August 2022.

Figure skating elements